The 2016–17 season was Atalanta Bergamasca Calcio's sixth consecutive season in Serie A.

The club enjoyed a season more successful than any previous one, finishing 4th in Serie A with 72 points, winning 21 games, although they were eliminated in the Coppa Italia in the round of 16.

The season was notable for the emergence of a group of talented young players brought into the fold by coach Gian Piero Gasperini, including Italian defenders Mattia Caldara and Andrea Conti, who, in addition to providing excellent defensive displays, also scored a remarkable 15 league goals between them; Italian midfielder Roberto Gagliardini, whose early season performances led to a transfer to Inter on loan in January; and Ivorian midfielder Franck Kessié, who would transfer to Milan soon after the end of the season on a two-year loan. Lastly, Argentine winger Alejandro Gómez enjoyed an excellent campaign as Atalanta's main attacking threat, finishing with 16 goals.

Players

Squad information
Players and squad numbers last updated on 25 March 2017.Note: Flags indicate national team as has been defined under FIFA eligibility rules. Players may hold more than one non-FIFA nationality.

Transfers

In

Loans in

Out

Loans out

Pre-season and friendlies

Competitions

Overall

Last updated: 28 May 2017

Serie A

League table

Results summary

Results by round

Matches

Coppa Italia

Statistics

Appearances and goals

|-
! colspan=14 style=background:#DCDCDC; text-align:center| Goalkeepers

|-
! colspan=14 style=background:#DCDCDC; text-align:center| Defenders

|-
! colspan=14 style=background:#DCDCDC; text-align:center| Midfielders

|-
! colspan=14 style=background:#DCDCDC; text-align:center| Forwards

|-
! colspan=14 style=background:#DCDCDC; text-align:center| Players transferred out during the season

Goalscorers

Last updated: 27 May 2017

Clean sheets

Last updated: 27 May 2017

Disciplinary record

Last updated: 27 May 2017

References

Atalanta B.C. seasons
Atalanta